The Nevada Press Association is the official member trade organization for news publications in the state of Nevada. It is a non-profit organization that represents seven daily and thirty-five weekly news publications in Nevada and the Lake Tahoe region of Northern California, as well as two online news services.

History 
The history of the NPA dates back to 1888, when an association of Nevada newspapers was first organized, with Mark Twain a founding member. In 1924, the organization officially became the Nevada State Press Association after a journalism professor at the University of Nevada, Reno spearheaded a reorganization campaign. The organization dropped the word "State" from its name in 1995, becoming the Nevada Press Association. The board of directors that governs the association is composed of 11 officers elected by member newspapers from around the state.

Each year, the NPA hosts a Better Newspapers Contest in which member publications compete for first, second and third place in categories ranging from Best Feature to Journalist of Merit (given to journalists with less than five years' experience), judged by an out-of-town press association.

The offices of the Nevada Press Association were located in the historic Rinckel Mansion, built in 1876, from 2000 until 2021 when the foundation sold the building. It was sold so the organization could focus on fostering and promoting good journalism in Nevada.

Mission Statement 
The mission statement of the association is as follows: 
"The Nevada Press Association is dedicated to representing the common interests of Nevada newspapers, furthering the public's right to know through an understanding that strong newspapers (protected by the First Amendment) are the cornerstone of a democratic society, promoting a closer fellowship within the newspaper fraternity, encouraging the elevation of journalistic standards and promoting the value of newspaper advertising."

NPA Member publications

Daily newspapers
 Elko Daily Free Press
 Las Vegas Review-Journal
 Las Vegas Sun
 Reno Gazette-Journal
 Nevada Appeal
 Sparks Tribune

Non-daily newspapers
 Battle Mountain Bugle
 Boulder City Review
 Comstock Chronicle
 Construction Notebook
 Dayton Courier
 Desert Valley Times
 El Tiempo
 Ely Times
 Eureka Sentinel
 Fernley Leader
 Gaming Today
 The Humboldt Sun
 High Desert Advocate
 VEGAS INC
 Lahontan Valley News
 Las Vegas Business Press
 Las Vegas CityLife
 Las Vegas Weekly
 Lincoln County Record
 Lovelock Review-Miner
 Mason Valley News
 Mesquite Local News
 Mineral County Independent-News
 Moapa Valley Progress
 Nevada Legal News
 Nevada Rancher
 North Lake Tahoe Bonanza
 Northern Nevada Business Weekly
 Pahrump Valley Times
 The Record-Courier
 Reno News & Review
 Sierra Sun
 Tahoe Daily Tribune
 Tahoe World
 Tonopah Times-Bonanza
 Vegas Seven
 View
 Virginia City News
 Wells Progress
 Wendover Times

Specialized publication
 Athlon Sports
 CarsonNow.org
 Construction Notebook
 El Tiempo
 Gaming Today
 VEGAS INC
 Las Vegas Business Press
 Nevada Legal News
 Nevada Magazine
 The Nevada Rancher
 Northern Nevada Business Weekly
 Veterans Reporter
 View

References

External links
 

Newspaper associations
Organizations based in Nevada
Organizations established in 1888
1888 establishments in Nevada